Rymättylä is a former municipality of Finland. It was, together with Merimasku and Velkua, consolidated with the town of Naantali on January 1, 2009.

It is located in the province of Western Finland and is part of the Southwest Finland region. The municipality had a population of 2,165 (2008-12-31) and covered an area of 150.11 km2 of which 3.66 km2 is water. The population density was 13.65 inhabitants per km2.

The municipality was unilingually Finnish.

References

External links

Official website 

Former municipalities of Finland
Naantali
Finnish islands in the Baltic
Populated places disestablished in 2009
2009 disestablishments in Finland